Chedighaii hutchisoni was a bothremydid turtle that lived during the Late Cretaceous. It was named in 2006 by Gaffney et al. for a specimen, KUVP 14765, consisting only of a skull. The specimen was found in the San Juan Basin of New Mexico in the Hunter Wash Member of the Kirtland Formation. The formation is one of many formations that are from the  Kirtlandian land-vertebrate age, and date from 74.0 million years ago. The holotype skull is nearly complete. No skeleton or carapace is known, but the material of "Naiadochelys" ingravata might be assignable to C. hutchisoni.

References

Late Cretaceous turtles of North America
Fossil taxa described in 2006
Bothremydidae
Prehistoric turtle genera